Jack White   was an Anglican Archdeacon in India in the mid 20th century.
 
White trained  at Bishop Wilson Theological College, Isle of Man and was ordained in 1927. After curacies at Malew, Rushen and Douglas he went out to India with the Eccles Establishment. He served at Bangalore, Bombay, Trimulgherry, Ootacamund and Madras, where he was Archdeacon  from 1944 to 1948.

References

20th-century Indian Anglican priests
Alumni of Bishop Wilson Theological College
Archdeacons of Madras
Eccles Establishment people
Manx Anglican priests